Qarajeh Qayah or Qarajeh Qayeh may refer to:
 Qarajeh Qayah, Hashtrud
 Qarajeh Qayeh, Maragheh
 Qarajeh Qayeh, Meyaneh